The 1869 Mallow by-election was contested on 4 January 1869.  The by-election was held because the incumbent Liberal MP, Edward Sullivan, became Attorney General for Ireland. It was retained by Sullivan who was unopposed.

References

By-elections to the Parliament of the United Kingdom in County Cork constituencies
Mallow, County Cork
1869 elections in the United Kingdom
Unopposed ministerial by-elections to the Parliament of the United Kingdom in Irish constituencies
January 1869 events
1869 elections in Ireland